The 2018 Liberty Flames football team represented Liberty University in the 2018 NCAA Division I FBS football season. They were led by seventh-year head coach Turner Gill and played their home games at Williams Stadium. This was the Flames first year as a member of the FBS. Playing as an independent, they finished the season 6–6. As part of their transition to FBS, since they won six games, Liberty would have been allowed to apply for bowl eligibility had there not been enough teams with non-losing records to fill the available bowl games, but there were already four more teams than could be accommodated.

On December 3, head coach Turner Gill retired. He finished at Liberty with a seven-year record of 47–35. On December 7, Liberty hired former Ole Miss head coach Hugh Freeze for the job.

Previous season
In their final season in the FCS as a member of the Big South Conference, the Flames finished the 2017 season 6–5, 2–3 in Big South play to finish in fourth place.

Schedule

Sources:

Game summaries

Old Dominion

at Army

North Texas

at New Mexico

at New Mexico State

Troy

Idaho State

at UMass

at Virginia

at Auburn

New Mexico State

Norfolk State

This game was originally scheduled for September 15, but it was rescheduled due to Hurricane Florence.
On December 4, 2018, Turner Gill announced that he would retire immediately. On December 7, Hugh Freeze was tabbed to be the next head coach of the Liberty Flames football team.

References

Liberty
Liberty Flames football seasons
Liberty Flames football